Bitonupa is a monotypic genus of daesiid camel spiders, first described by Carl Friedrich Roewer in 1933. Its single species, Bitonupa kraepelini is distributed in Tanzania.

References 

Solifugae
Arachnid genera
Monotypic arachnid genera